Plekhanovo Airport  is an airport in Tyumen Oblast, Russia located 4 km west of Tyumen. A small civilian airport with a parking tarmac, it is one of two airports serving the city of Tyumen, the other being Roshchino International Airport. Plekhanovo Airport is the base for Utair Airlines.

Tyumen is a developing city within Russia. The city's current electrical distribution system does not have capacity to cover all areas of the city. Plans to expand the network include constructing a gas turbine station in western Tyumen that will supply electricity to the Zarechnaya district, and the area surrounding the airport. In 2021, a proposal was approved to finance the construction of a residential area around the Plekhanovo airtport using infrastructure bonds.

References 

Airports built in the Soviet Union
Airports in Tyumen Oblast